Jesse Robert Buckles (May 20, 1890 – August 2, 1975), nicknamed "Jim", was a Major League Baseball pitcher who appeared in two games, both in relief, for the New York Yankees near the end of the 1916 season.
  
Buckles made his major league debut on September 17, 1916, against the Cleveland Indians at League Park.  His second and final appearance (October 3) was in a home game against the Washington Senators at the Polo Grounds.  In his two games he pitched a total of four innings and gave up just one earned run, giving him an ERA of 2.25.

External links
Baseball Reference
Retrosheet

Major League Baseball pitchers
Baseball players from California
New York Yankees players
1890 births
1975 deaths
Harrisburg Islanders players
Holyoke Papermakers players
Medicine Hat Hatters players
Troy Trojans (minor league) players
Scranton Miners players
Moose Jaw Robin Hoods players